San Tomé Airport  is an airport at the town of San Tomé, in the Venezuelan state of Anzoátegui.

The San Tome VOR-DME (Ident: SOM) and non-directional beacon (Ident: SOM) are located on the field.

Airlines and destinations

See also
Transport in Venezuela
List of airports in Venezuela
El Tigre Airport

References

External links
SkyVector - San Tomé Airport

OurAirports - San Tomé
OpenStreetMap - San Tomé

Airports in Venezuela
Buildings and structures in Anzoátegui
El Tigre